Fred Wise may refer to:

Fred Wise (physician) (1881–1950), American dermatologist
Fred Wise (songwriter) (1915–1966), American lyricist who wrote songs for Elvis Presley

See also 
 Frederick Wise, 1st Baron Wise (1887–1968), British Labour Party politician
Fredric Wise (1871–1928), British Conservative Party politician